Nataša Bojković (born 3 September 1971) is a Serbian chess player, an International Master (IM) and a Woman Grandmaster (WGM).

She won the Girls' World Junior Chess Championship in 1991.

She won the Women's Yugoslav Chess Championship four times.

She has competed for the world championship, most recently in the Women's World Chess Championship 2000 where she made it to the second round.

See also 
 List of female chess players

External links 
 
 
 
 
 

1971 births
Living people
Serbian female chess players
Chess International Masters
Chess woman grandmasters
World Junior Chess Champions
Place of birth missing (living people)